Sergio Fernández González (born 23 May 1977), known simply as Sergio, is a Spanish former footballer who played as a central defender.

In 16 years as a professional, he played mainly for Celta and Osasuna, starting and ending his career with Sporting de Gijón. He appeared in 295 La Liga matches over 15 seasons, scoring nine goals.

Club career
A tall, lanky defender, Sergio was born in Avilés, Asturias, and emerged through Sporting de Gijón's youth system, making his first appearance for the main squad on 7 January 1996 in a 3–2 home win against UD Salamanca. He would play three further seasons as first choice, with the club being relegated from La Liga in 1998.

Sergio joined RC Celta de Vigo in the summer of 1999, being a somewhat important defensive figure in the Galicians' domestic and European consolidation. After relegation at the end of the 2003–04 campaign (19 games played), he contributed with one goal in a 2–1 home victory over Xerez CD on 9 January 2005 as the side eventually returned to the top division, and continued to appear prominently as they immediately achieved a UEFA Cup position.

Sergio moved to Real Zaragoza for 2006–07, reuniting with former Celta manager Víctor Fernández and teammate Juanfran and playing 28 matches en route to another sixth place in the league, which again led to the UEFA Cup. However, in spite of his late equaliser against Real Madrid on 11 May 2008, in a 2–2 home draw, the Aragonese were relegated at the end of his second year.

In mid-November 2008, Sergio signed with CA Osasuna until the end of the top-flight season, as the Navarrese lost Rovérsio for its duration due to a serious knee injury in a Copa del Rey tie against Getafe CF. He received the Brazilian's No. 16 jersey.

The veteran continued to be regularly used the following years, under both José Antonio Camacho and his successor José Luis Mendilibar. On 6 March 2011, he headed home a 92nd-minute corner kick in a 1–0 away defeat of Málaga CF in what was his team's first away win of the campaign.

On 20 June 2012, after having contributed one goal from 20 appearances to help Osasuna retain their league status, the 35-year-old Sergio signed for two years with former club Sporting, in turn relegated to the second division. Only four months later, however, he decided to retire due to a chronic injury.

References

External links

1977 births
Living people
People from Avilés
Spanish footballers
Footballers from Asturias
Association football defenders
La Liga players
Segunda División players
Segunda División B players
Sporting de Gijón B players
Sporting de Gijón players
RC Celta de Vigo players
Real Zaragoza players
CA Osasuna players
Spain under-21 international footballers